Zsófi Szemerey (born 2 June 1994) is a Hungarian handball goalkeeper who plays for Mosonmagyaróvári KC SE.

References

External links
 Profile on Győri ETO KC official website
 Career statistics at Worldhandball

1994 births
Living people
People from Kazincbarcika
Hungarian female handball players
Győri Audi ETO KC players
Sportspeople from Borsod-Abaúj-Zemplén County